Trechus apoduvalipenis is a species of ground beetle in the subfamily Trechinae. It was first described by Salgado Costas & Ortuno in 1998.

References

apoduvalipenis
Beetles described in 1998